AM 748 I 4to is an Icelandic vellum manuscript fragment containing several Eddaic poems. It dates to the beginning of the 14th century. AM 748 I is split into two parts. AM 748 I a 4to is kept in the Arnamagnæan Institute in Copenhagen. AM 748 I b 4to is kept at the Árni Magnússon Institute for Icelandic Studies in Reykjavík. The six sheets which have been preserved of AM 748 I a 4to contain the following poems, all mythological.

Grímnismál (complete)
Hymiskviða (complete)
Baldrs draumar (complete)
Skírnismál (partial)
Hárbarðsljóð (partial)
Vafþrúðnismál (partial)
Völundarkviða (only the beginning of the prose prologue)

AM 748 I a 4to is the only mediaeval manuscript to preserve Baldrs draumar. The other poems are also preserved in Codex Regius.

References

AM 748 I 4to Facsimile edition and information.

Icelandic manuscripts
Sources of Norse mythology
14th-century books
Árni Magnússon Institute for Icelandic Studies collection